Szczypkowice  is a village in the administrative district of Gmina Główczyce, within Słupsk County, Pomeranian Voivodeship, in northern Poland.

Here was Johann III Bernoulli and wrote about Kashubians. For the history of the region, see History of Pomerania.

The village has a population of 492.

References

Szczypkowice